The Empire is a residential complex consisting of two identical towers of 33 and 37 floors. The  towers are built on a 1.03-acre site where the old Empire Theatre once stood.

See also 
 List of tallest structures in Sri Lanka

References 

Residential skyscrapers in Sri Lanka
Apartment buildings in Colombo
Residential skyscrapers